Ng Wing Hon (born 17 June 1967) is a Hong Kong freestyle and medley swimmer. He competed in three events at the 1984 Summer Olympics.

References

External links
 

1967 births
Living people
Hong Kong male freestyle swimmers
Hong Kong male medley swimmers
Olympic swimmers of Hong Kong
Swimmers at the 1984 Summer Olympics
Place of birth missing (living people)
Swimmers at the 1982 Asian Games
Asian Games competitors for Hong Kong